"Mr. Simple" is a song recorded in two languages (Korean and Japanese) by South Korean boy band Super Junior. The Korean version was released as the lead single off their fifth studio album of the same name digitally on August 2, 2011, via SM Entertainment. In Japan, the single was made available via Avex Trax on December 7, 2011.

"Mr. Simple" became the 85th best-selling single of 2011 in Japan according to the Oricon charts and is certified Gold by the RIAJ for 100,000 units shipped to Japanese music stores. The song was additionally used as a commercial tie-up for Japanese satellite communication holding company SKY Perfect JSAT Group, and as the ending theme song of TBS's Tsubo Musume in January 2012.

Background 
The song was released along with the rest of the album's tracks on August 2, 2011, and has topped online charts hours after its release. The song was written by Yoo Young-jin, which was also the writer of their previous lead singles "Twins (Knock Out)", "Don't Don", "Sorry, Sorry" and "Bonamana". SM Entertainment describes the song as:

Japanese release
The Japanese version of the song was released as their second Japanese single on December 7, 2011, under Avex Trax. A b-side track of the single entitled "Snow White" was revealed via the group's official Japanese website on November 30, 2011. The single debuted at #2 in the Oricon Weekly Charts, selling 89,000 copies on its first week of release, outselling their previous Japanese single "Bijin (Bonamana)" which sold 59,000 on its first week and 67,000 on total sales, making it Super Junior's highest-selling Japanese release yet.

Commercial performance
The single debuted at number three in the Oricon Daily Singles Chart on December 6, 2011, selling 17,000 copies. It plunged down to number six for three days and later peaked at number one by December 10, 2011, the day on which the group's Super Show 4 Osaka leg commenced, selling 36,000 copies, beating AKB48's Ue kara Mariko which sold 23,000 copies, at number two. The latter marks Super Junior's first time to have a release to peak at number one since debut. By the end of 2011, the single was ranked as the 85th best-selling single of 2011 in Japan according to the Oricon charts.

Music video
The music video for the song was released on August 4, 2011, via SM Entertainment's official SMTOWN YouTube page while its Japanese version PV was released November 13, 2011, via Space Shower TV.

Track listing

Japanese single
 "Mr. Simple" – 3:59
 "Snow White" – 4:07
 "Mr. Simple" (Korean ver.) – 3:59
 "Mr. Simple" (Instrumental) – 3:59 (CD Only)
 "Snow White" (Instrumental) – 4:07 (CD Only)

CD+DVD Track list
 "Mr. Simple"
 "Mr. Simple" (Korean ver.)

CD+DVD limited pressing edition DVD track list
 "Mr. Simple"
 "Mr. Simple" (Dance ver.)
 "Mr. Simple" (Korean ver.)
 "Mr. Simple" (Korean ver.) [Type B]
 Off Shot Clip

Accolades

Charts

Daily and weekly charts

Year-end charts

Sales and certifications

Credits
Credits adapted from album's liner notes.

Studio 
 SM Booming System – recording, mixing, digital editing
 Sonic Korea – mastering

Personnel 
 SM Entertainment – executive producer
 Lee Soo-man – producer
 Super Junior – vocals, background vocals 
 Yoo Young-jin – producer, Korean lyrics, composition, arrangement, vocal directing, background vocals, recording, mixing, digital editing, music and sound supervisor
 Goro Matsui – Japanese lyrics
 Jeon Hoon – mastering

References

External links 
 SM Entertainment's Official Site
 Super Junior's Official Site 

Super Junior songs
Korean-language songs
2011 singles
SM Entertainment singles
Songs written by Yoo Young-jin
Songs with lyrics by Gorō Matsui
Avex Trax singles
2011 songs